CRAL-TRIO domain is a protein structural domain that binds small lipophilic molecules.  This domain is named after cellular retinaldehyde-binding protein (CRALBP) and TRIO guanine exchange factor.

CRALB protein carries 11-cis-retinol or 11-cis-retinaldehyde. It modulates interaction of retinoids with visual cycle enzymes. TRIO is involved in coordinating actin remodeling, which is necessary for cell migration and growth.

Other members of the family are alpha-tocopherol transfer protein and phosphatidylinositol-transfer protein (Sec14). They transport their substrates (alpha-tocopherol and phosphatidylinositol or phosphatidylcholine, respectively)  between different intracellular membranes. Family also include a guanine nucleotide exchange factor that may function as an effector of RAC1 small G-protein.

The N-terminal domain of yeast ECM25 protein has been identified as containing a lipid binding CRAL-TRIO domain.

Structure
The Sec14 protein was the first CRAL-TRIO domain for which the structure was determined. The structure contains several alpha helices as well as a beta sheet composed of 6 strands.  Strands 2,3,4 and 5 form a parallel beta sheet with strands 1 and 6 being anti-parallel. The structure also identified a hydrophobic binding pocket for lipid binding.

Human proteins containing this domain 
C20orf121; MOSPD2;    PTPN9;     RLBP1;     RLBP1L1;   RLBP1L2;   SEC14L1;   SEC14L2;
SEC14L3;   SEC14L4;   TTPA;

References

External links
  - Calculated spatial positions of CRAL-TRIO domains in membrane

Peripheral membrane proteins
Protein domains
Water-soluble transporters